The 1976 Workington by-election was a parliamentary by-election held in England for the House of Commons constituency of Workington in Cumbria on 4 November 1976.  It was won by the Conservative Party candidate Richard Page, who became the first non-Labour MP in the constituency’s history.

Vacancy 
The seat had become vacant when the Labour Member of Parliament (MP), Fred Peart had been elevated to the peerage in order to serve as Leader of the House of Lords and Lord Privy Seal. He had held the seat since the 1945 general election, and had served in previous Cabinets under Harold Wilson and James Callaghan.

Candidates 
The Labour candidate was 33-year-old Dale Campbell-Savours, the Managing Director of a clock company who had fought Darwen in both the February and October elections of 1974.

The Conservative Party candidate was Richard Page, who was 35 and had contested the Workington seat against Peart in both 1974 general elections.

Result 
The result was a surprise victory for Page and the Conservatives, with a majority of 1,065 votes. Workington had been a safe Labour seat, held even in the landslide defeat of 1931.

Both the main contenders in this by-election would go on to long Parliamentary careers. Campbell-Savours defeated Page for the Workington seat at the 1979 election, and would represent it until standing down at the 2001 election, when he was elevated to the Lords.

After his defeat, Page soon returned to the House of Commons at a 1979 by-election for the constituency of South West Hertfordshire, which he would represent until the 2005 election.

Votes

See also

Workington constituency
List of United Kingdom by-elections (1950-1979)
2017 Copeland by-election

References

Workington by-election
Workington by-election
1970s in Cumbria
By-elections to the Parliament of the United Kingdom in Cumbria constituencies
Politics of Allerdale
Workington by-election